The 2009 Tour de Suisse was the 73rd edition of the Tour de Suisse stage race. It took place from 13 June to 21 June and is part of both the 2009 UCI ProTour and the inaugural World Calendar. It began with a short individual time trial in Liechtenstein and ended with another time trial, in Bern. The race was won by Fabian Cancellara.

Teams
As the Tour de Suisse was a UCI ProTour event, all 18 ProTour teams were invited automatically.

The 20 teams participating in the race were:

Route

Stages

Stage 113 June 2009 – Mauren (Liechtenstein) to Ruggell (Liechtenstein),  (ITT)The course for the brief individual time trial was deceptively difficult, with a categorized climb coming after 5 km and a technical descent down twisting, turning roads to the finish following it.

Two-time former world time trial champion and reigning Swiss national champion Fabian Cancellara was the winner of the opening individual time trial, taking the course 19 seconds faster than Liquigas' Roman Kreuziger. Despite the large gap Cancellara had over the man in second, most of the other times were tightly bunched, with 88 riders within a minute of Cancellara.

Stage 214 June 2009 – Davos, This stage began at 1400 m in elevation, descended to around 500 m, and ended back around 1500 m. After a small climb that came just after the beginning of the stage, there was a 35 km descent to the valley below and over 60 km of flat racing. At that point, the race went back uphill, with both a first- and a third-category climb coming before the finish.

The day began with a breakaway involving Javier Aramendia, Josef Benetseder, and Hervé Duclos-Lassalle, though their maximum advantage over the peloton was only 2'30". The three were caught with 25 km left to race, at which point Tony Martin launched a solo escape that got him over the first category climb before the finish in first position, giving him the lead in the mountains classification and its pink jersey. Martin was himself caught with 6 km to race as the teams of the sprinters worked to get the field together for a mass sprint finish. The sprint was so close between Bernhard Eisel, Gerald Ciolek, and Óscar Freire that even the riders themselves were unsure which of them had won. The photo finish showed Eisel to be the winner. Ninety-five riders had the same time as the stage winner, on a course that was not expected to produce a mass sprint finish.

Stage 315 June 2009 – Davos to Lumino, This course was undulating for about 100 km, before the first-category climb of Lukmanier Pass at nearly 2000 m in elevation. The descent from this height took about 40 km, with another 30 km of flat racing before the finish.

The day's escapees were Will Frischkorn, Enrico Gasparotto, Samuel Dumoulin, and Marlon Pérez. Their lead was three minutes at the top of Lukmanier Pass, but with the teams of the sprinters working to get another sprint finish and Gasparotto threatening the overall race lead of Fabian Cancellara (he began the stage 48 seconds back), the peloton caught them with 3 km remaining in the stage. Ryder Hesjedal tried a solo move when the catch occurred, but he was caught with a little over 1 km to go. A bunched sprint was the finish, with Mark Cavendish winning after a successful leadout from Bernhard Eisel, Tony Martin, and George Hincapie.

Stage 416 June 2009 – Biasca to Stäfa, This was a mountainous course, which is marked by the outside-categorization climb of Tremola coming almost immediately. At 2108 m, it was the highest point reached in the 2009 Tour de Suisse. There was also a second-category climb later on in the course, the descent from which left close to 40 km of flat racing prior the stage conclusion.

The stage began with a very large early breakaway, with 26 riders coming clear, representing every team except Rabobank. The best-placed man in the group was Columbia–High Road's Tony Martin, who began the day 34 seconds behind race leader Fabian Cancellara. Martin, however, was unable to make the second selection of the day, as 9 of the 26 came clear and wound up contesting the stage together, while the other 17 returned to the peloton.

Tadej Valjavec was the first to try for the stage win, attacking solo from the group of nine with 6 km remaining in the stage, but the Saxo Bank duo of Matti Breschel and Andy Schleck chased him down, uniting the group again. Thomas Rohregger was the next to try his luck, but was caught in the final 150 meters. Maxim Iglinsky looked like he was in line for the win, but Breschel came around him and pipped him at the line for the stage win. The race lead transferred to Valjavec, whose time bonus for third place on the stage outweighed the bonuses Schleck had gotten for winning the intermediate sprints. Schleck wound up in the blue jersey after the stage.

Stage 517 June 2009 – Stäfa to Serfaus (Austria), This was considered the queen stage of the 2009 Tour de Suisse. There were four categorized climbs on the course, two each in the first and third categories. Two of these climbs occurred within the stage's final 10 km, with only a brief false flat between the first-category climb and the third-category summit finish.

There were numerous breakaways during this stage. The first came from Pascal Hungerbühler, who was away alone for the race's first 150 km, holding a maximum advantage of eight minutes. When he was caught, another escape effort involving Marcus Burghardt and Björn Schröder took shape, but they were caught with 10 km left to race, their maximum advantage having been only 46 seconds. Rein Taaramäe and Tony Martin then tried their luck, but were caught by the yellow jersey group with 5 km remaining. The group tried repeatedly to attack and isolate race leader Tadej Valjavec, but his Ag2r team worked to keep the favorites in the same group on the road. Fifteen riders were indeed together for a sprint finish, won by Michael Albasini as he edged out countryman Fabian Cancellara at the line. The day saw a big loser in time, as Andy Schleck lost over a minute to the yellow jersey group, finishing 25th on the stage and dropping from second all the way to 13th on GC after the stage.

Stage 618 June 2009 – Oberriet to Bad Zurzach, This was a flat stage. After a second-category climb 10 km into the stage, the profile was very flat, with only two small third-category climbs later on. There was a perfectly flat stretch of about 8 km before the finish.

Reto Hollenstein of the continental team  managed to break away after 50 km, and stayed solo until 19 km from the finish. Thor Hushovd moved to the front on the wheel of George Hincapie, but was unable to hold off Hincapie's teammate Mark Cavendish. Cavendish took his second stage win of the tour. Fabian Cancellara earned five bonus seconds in intermediate sprints to move into second place in the general classification and trail race leader Tadej Valjavec by only 9 seconds.

Stage 719 June 2009 – Bad Zurzach to Vallorbe Juraparc, For 180 km, this looked like a perfect sprinters' stage, as the course didn't so much as undulate during that time. In the last 24 km, there were two categorized climbs, a third-category climb which preceded a shallow descent before a second-category summit stage finish.

After several unsuccessful breakaway efforts, José Joaquín Rojas, Marcus Burghardt, and Gerald Ciolek succeeded in their escape attempt. Damien Gaudin joined them after a lengthy solo chase, and the four were together as a group for much of the stage, gaining a maximum advantage of six minutes by the 130 km mark. The yellow jersey peloton caught them on the ascent of the third-category climb before the finish. The yellow jersey group stayed together through the first cliumb and the intermediate sprint that came right after it. On the ascend to the stage finish, beginning 3 km from the finish, Roman Kreuziger and Michael Albasini both tried to escape for the stage win, but Kreuziger was fresher, as only he was able to stay away for any length of time. He built an advantage of 17 seconds and appeared poised for the stage win. Maxime Monfort drove the yellow jersey group to a pace that allowed Kim Kirchen to attack next and catch Kreuziger in the stage's final meters for the win.

Stage 820 June 2009 – Le Sentier to Crans-Montana, This stage started at 1000 m and descended to a valley at 400 m about 50 km later. For the next 90 km, the course was perfectly flat. There was then an uncategorized "wall" of about 200 m in height before a third- and a first-category climb just before the finish.

This stage saw another four-man escape group, Marcel Wyss, Pavel Brutt, Lars Boom, and Hervé Duclos-Lassalle. Their maximum advantage was five and a half minutes, after 132 km. By the beginning of the third-category climb of Botyre, their advantage was just thirty seconds. They were easily caught on that ascent. Team Saxo Bank drove the peloton, to protect Fabian Cancellara from attacks, chiefly from the Liquigas duo of Roman Kreuziger and Oliver Zaugg. In the final kilometer, mountains classification leader Tony Martin and Damiano Cunego attacked and got a small gap over the yellow jersey group, with Martin holding off Cunego in the sprint to give Team Columbia–High Road its sixth stage win in this Tour de Suisse.

Stage 921 June 2009 – Bern,  (ITT)'''

The course for the final individual time trial was gently undulating, without any categorized climbs. The finish came on a perfectly flat stretch about 3 km in length; there was a similar perfectly flat stretch about 6 km long earlier in the course.

The early time to beat was set by Silence–Lotto rider Thomas Dekker. His time held up against most of the top riders on GC, as he finished the stage third. The first man to beat him was mountains classification winner Tony Martin, winner of the previous day's stage. His ride was good enough to propel him from fourth overall onto the event's final podium, in second. The second-to-last man to take the course was the stage winner. Time trial specialist Fabian Cancellara dominated the field, with no rider finishing inside a minute of his winning time. Race leader Tadej Valjavec finished 59th on the stage, almost four minutes back of Cancellara, to drop from the race lead to seventh in the final standings. Cancellara wound up as Tour de Suisse champion by over two minutes, after trailing coming into the final day.

Riders' jersey progress table
In the 2009 Tour de Suisse, four different jerseys were awarded. For the general classification, calculated by adding the finishing times of the stages per cyclist, and allowing time bonuses for the first three finishers on mass start stages, the leader received a yellow jersey. This classification is considered the most important of the Tour de Suisse, and the winner of the general classification is considered the winner of the Tour de Suisse.

Additionally, there was also a points classification, indicated with a green jersey. In the points classification, cyclists got points for finishing in the top 12 in a stage. The stage win awarded 15 points, second place awarded 12 points, third 10, and one point less per place down the line, to a single point for twelfth. In addition, some points could be won in intermediate sprints.

There was also a mountains classification, indicated with a pink jersey. In the mountains classifications, points are won by reaching the top of a mountain before other cyclists. All climbs were categorized, with most either first, second, third, or fourth-category, with more points available for the higher-categorized climbs. There was also an outside categorization climb at the beginning of Stage 4, which awarded even more points than the first-category climbs.

The fourth classification was the sprint classification. Riders earned points based on their placings in intermediate sprints (which also awarded points toward the green jersey). Points were awarded to the top three in each sprint, six for first, three for second, and one for third – same as for the green jersey. The leader of the sprint classification received a blue jersey.

There was also classification for teams. In this classification, the times of the best three cyclists per stage are added, and the team with the lowest time is leading team.

Jersey wearers when one rider is leading two or more competitions
If a cyclist leads two or more competitions at the end of a stage, he receives all those jerseys. The next stage, he can only wear one jersey, and he wears the jersey representing leadership in the most important competition (yellow first, then pink, then green, then blue). The other jerseys that the cyclist holds are worn in the next stage by the second-placed rider (or, if needed, third- or fourth-placed rider) of that classification.

After stage 1, Fabian Cancellara received the yellow jersey and the green jersey, because he was leading both the general and the points classifications. In stage 2, he wore the yellow jersey, and the green jersey was worn by the second-placed cyclist in the points classification, Roman Kreuziger.
In stage 3, Josef Benetseder wore the blue jersey.
In stage 3, Bernhard Eisel wore the green jersey.

References

2009 in Austrian sport
2009 in Liechtenstein sport
Tour de Suisse
2009 UCI ProTour
2009
2009 UCI World Ranking